Communications in Contemporary Mathematics (CCM) is a journal published by World Scientific since 1999. It covers research in the fields such as applied mathematics, dynamical systems, mathematical physics, and topology.

Abstracting and indexing 
The journal is indexed in Zentralblatt MATH, Mathematical Reviews, ISI Alerting Services, CompuMath Citation Index, Current Contents/Physical, Chemical and Earth Sciences, and the Science Citation Index.

References 

Publications established in 1999
Mathematics journals
World Scientific academic journals
English-language journals